Shane Clifton is an Australian theologian.

Clifton was the Dean of Theology at Alphacrucis College (Sydney, New South Wales, Australia, resigning in 2019.). He received his PhD from the Australian Catholic University. In addition to his role with Alphacrucis, Clifton is the editor of the Australasian Pentecostal Studies journal. His 2005 dissertation and subsequent book (published 2009) was entitled Pentecostal Churches in Transition.  He has co-written Globalization and the Mission of the Church with ACU's Professor Neil Ormerod. After a serious accident, in October 2010,  that left him a quadriplegic, Shane has focused his scholarly work on exploring the intersection between disability and various conceptions of the good life.  He writes about his experience of living with a disability on his blog. Clifton resides in Southwestern Sydney with his wife and children.

References

External links 
 Official website and blog

Year of birth missing (living people)
Living people
Australian Christian theologians
People with tetraplegia
Academic staff of the Australian Catholic University